"Part of the Union" is a song by English band Strawbs, featured on their 1973 album Bursting at the Seams and was the band's most successful single, peaking at No. 2 in the UK Singles Chart. It also reached No. 10 in the Irish Singles Chart.

Background
The song was included on the album Bursting at the Seams but is not considered typical of the songs on that album. Indeed, the track was originally recorded without a contribution by band leader Dave Cousins and was to be released under the name of "The Brothers". It demonstrates the different, more commercial direction the writing partnership of Richard Hudson and John Ford was taking within the band.

The song (especially its chorus "You don't get me I'm part of the Union") quickly became popular as an unofficial anthem of the trade union movement. Subsequently, the Strawbs have confirmed that the song was written with genuine celebratory intent, in support of the unions.

The song resurfaced on the UK television advertisement for insurance company Norwich Union in 1998.

The B-side track "Will You Go" is an arrangement of the Irish folk song "Wild Mountain Thyme" written by Belfast musician Francis McPeake, dating back to the repertoire of The Strawberry Hill Boys (the original name of Strawbs)

The song is played at the end of Philadelphia Union home games.

Top of the Pops
In the band's appearance on BBC's Top of the Pops, keyboardist Blue Weaver appeared with both piano and pedal harmonium and drummer Richard Hudson appeared with a marching bass drum emblazoned with the words "The Associated Union of Strawbs Workers".

Charts

Other recordings

The original "Brothers" recording can be found on the box set A Taste of Strawbs. Cockerel Chorus (of "Nice One Cyril" fame) also recorded the song for inclusion on their 1973 Party Sing-a-long album.

Recorded by The Hindle Strikers with T.B.E. in 1984 on the Catch 22 label (CTT001A) – originally they recorded it on cassette unaware that DJs required it on vinyl to play it on the radio.

From 2007 to 2016 the song has been included as a standard part of the Strawbs' live set and was included in their live DVD The Strawbs – Lay Down With The Strawbs, filmed and recorded live at The Robin 2 in Bilston, UK on 5 March 2006.

Personnel

 Dave Cousins – backing vocals, acoustic guitar
 Dave Lambert – backing vocals, electric guitar
 John Ford – lead vocals, bass guitar
 Richard Hudson – backing vocals, drums
 Blue Weaver – piano, harmonium

References

Notes

Other sources  
 "Part of the Union" at Strawbsweb official site
 "Part of the Union" – covers at Strawbsweb official site

External links
"Part of the Union" – lyrics at Strawbsweb official site
"Will You Go" – lyrics at Strawbsweb official site
 

1973 singles
Strawbs songs
1973 songs
Trade union songs
Songs written by John Ford (musician)
Songs written by Richard Hudson (musician)